America Votes is a 501(c)(4) organization that aims "to coordinate and promote progressive issues." America Votes leads national and state-based coalitions to advance progressive policies and increase voter turnout for Democratic Party candidates.

America Votes was created prior to the 2004 United States presidential election by Ellen Malcolm, the founder of EMILY's List; former Sierra Club executive director Carl Pope; Harold Ickes; Steve Rosenthal; and Andy Stern, the former president of Service Employees International Union (SEIU). Greg Speed serves as president of the organization.

Activities
According to the Center for Public Integrity, "America Votes, a national liberal nonprofit group with significant union funding, made the 2011 and 2012 Wisconsin recall elections a top priority, providing a major cash infusion to a handful of groups that helped organize the efforts." America Votes donated $940,000 toward the ultimately unsuccessful recall effort against Wisconsin Governor Scott Walker.

Funding
America Votes does not disclose its donors. The group raised $12.7 million in 2013, and projects revenue of $8.5 million in 2014. According to the Center for Public Integrity, "Between 40 percent and 50 percent of that sum is projected to come from wealthy donors connected to the Democracy Alliance, a secretive nonprofit whose funders include the likes of billionaire investor George Soros and author, horticulturalist and philanthropist Amy Goldman."

In 2018, the Sixteen Thirty Fund gave America Votes $27 million. The $27 million grant was nearly twice the amount America Votes had previously ever raised in a single year.

Donors
The following groups have donated to America Votes:
National Education Association (over $1 million between October 2012 and September 2013)
Service Employees International Union ($443,000)
American Federation of State, County and Municipal Employees ($333,000)
United Food and Commercial Workers ($28,000)
Mayors Against Illegal Guns
League of Conservation Voters
Ballot Initiative Strategy Center
Tides Advocacy Fund ($1.8 million in 2012 election cycle)
Fred Eychaner
Jon Stryker

Member organizations
The following groups are listed on the America Votes website as "national partners":
 AFL–CIO
 American Federation of State, County and Municipal Employees (AFSCME)
 American Association for Justice
 American Federation of Teachers
 Americans for Responsible Solutions
 Ballot Initiative Strategy Center
 Bull Moose Sportsmen Alliance
 Center for Community Change
 Clean Water Action
 EMILY's List
 Environment America
 Every Voice
 Fair Elections Legal Network
 Fair Share
 Human Rights Campaign
 International Association of Fire Fighters
 International Brotherhood of Electrical Workers
 International Brotherhood of Teamsters
 League of Conservation Voters
 NARAL Pro-Choice America
 National Committee to Preserve Social Security and Medicare
 National Council of La Raza
 National Education Association
 People for the American Way
 Planned Parenthood Action Fund
 Progressive Majority
 ProgressNow Action
 Service Employees International Union (SEIU)
 Sierra Club
 The Voter Participation Center
 United Food and Commercial Workers International Union
 USAction
 VoteVets
 Women's Equality Center
 Working America

References

External links
 America Votes website

527 organizations
Progressive organizations in the United States
501(c)(4) nonprofit organizations